Cosmodiscus is a genus of beetles in the family Carabidae, first described by Thomas Gibson Sloane in 1907.

Species 
Cosmodiscus contains the following species:

 Cosmodiscus basilewskyi Straneo, 1956
 Cosmodiscus brunneus Darlington, 1962
 Cosmodiscus kivuana (Burgeon, 1935)
 Cosmodiscus mirei Straneo, 1995
 Cosmodiscus platynotus Bates, 1873
 Cosmodiscus rubripictus Sloane, 1907
 Cosmodiscus rufoapicalis Fedorenko, 2021
 Cosmodiscus rufolimbatus Jedlicka, 1936
 Cosmodiscus sharovae Fedorenko, 2021
 Cosmodiscus umeralis Andrewes, 1937

References

Pterostichinae